Lea Salonga is the fourth studio album by the Filipino Broadway pop singer Lea Salonga. It was her first album to receive an international release in October 1993 through Atlantic Records, making her the first Filipino singer to be signed on an international record label. The album peaked at number 25 on the Billboard Heatseekers Albums, making Salonga the first Filipino to break onto the American chart. The making of this album was helmed by two multi-Grammy Award winners: Producer Glen Ballard, and Executive Producer Steve Greenberg.

Track listing 
 Vision of You (Rick Nowels, Ellen Shipley)
 Every Time We Fall (Kit Hain, Mark Goldenberg)
 It's Just Good-Bye (Cynthia Weil, Jay Gruska)
 Finish What You Started (Marsha Malamet, Annie Roboff, April Lang)
 Heaven Tonight (Carole Rowley, Tessa Niles, Charlie Mole)
 We Could Be in Love (duet with Brad Kane) (Glen Burtnik, Shelly Peiken)
 Lessons of Love (Siedah Garrett, Glen Ballard)
 Remind My Heart (Hain, Jeff Franzel)
 I Honestly Love You (Jeff Barry, Peter Allen)
 A Flame for You (Dane Deviller, Sean Hosein, Connie Russell
 The Journey (Julie Gold)

Personnel
 Boy Angos - percussion
 Glen Ballard - keyboards
 Bruce Gaitson - acoustic guitar
 Mark Goldenberg - synthesizer
 Daniel Higgins - saxophone
 Joel F. Jacinto - percussion
 Jimmy Johnson - bass
 Randy Kerber - keyboards, synthesizer
 Brian Kilgore - percussion
 Michael Landau - guitar
 Greg Phillinganes - bass, synthesizer
 John Robinson - drums
 Lea Salonga - vocals
 Doug Scott - programming

Background vocals
 Maxi Anderson
 B.G. Ballard
 Amy Boylan
 Janak Chandrasoma
 Chalan Ford
 Phillip Ingram
 Edie Lehman
 Justin Jackson
 Megan Joyce
 Ben McCrary
 Arnold McCuller
 Clif Magness
 Rooney Saulsberry
 Christine Schilinger
 Mark Schilinger
 Kristen True
 Maxine Waters-Willard
 Julia Waters-Tilman

Charts

References

Lea Salonga albums
1993 albums
Albums produced by Glen Ballard
Atlantic Records albums